Emma Chukwugoziam Obi  was born in July 18, 1988. She is professionally known by her stage name as Emma Nyra.   She is an American-born Nigerian singer, song writer, an actress, and a model.

Emma Nyra is a mother of two. Her associate acts include Iyanya, Selebobo, Davido, Cynthia Morgan, Victoria Kimani, and Patoranking.

Early life
Emma Nyra was born and raised in Tyler, Texas, where she had her early education. She is an Igbo descent from Delta State, Nigeria. In 2012, she left for Nigeria to pursue a career in music and modelling.

Education 
She is an alumna of Texas Southern University, where she graduated with a degree in Health Care Administration.

Career

Music
Emma Nyra released her debut singles titled "Do It" and "Everything I Do" in 2011 while in the U.S. Upon her return to Nigeria in 2012, she started working with D'Tunes and Iyanya who she had met in 2010 while in the U.S. In March 2012, she signed a recording contract with Made Men Music Group before she went on to make her first major debut in the Nigerian music industry.  After that she made a vocal appearance in Iyanya's "Ur Waist".

In 2013, Emma Nyra was voted the "Most Promising Act to Watch" at the 2013 edition of the Nigeria Entertainment Awards. Emma Nyra went on to release several singles which saw her touring the United States and Canada between 2013 and 2014. She has  worked with the likes of Davido, Patoranking, and Olu Maintain among others. In 2015, Emma Nyra was listed on "notJustOk'''s" list of 15 Artists to Watch in 2015. Her debut studio album titled Emma Nyra Hot Like Fiya Vol. 1 is yet to be released.

Film   
Apart from music, Emma Nyra is also an actress. She has so far appeared in three films including American Driver, Rebound, and the Re-Union.

Exit from Made Men Music
In 2014, Emma Nyra ended her recording contract with Made Men Music Group. While the press hinted on relationship issues, Emma Nyra cited "abuse with physical and verbal force" from her then manager Ubi Franklin as the reason why she left the label imprint. The allegations were however denied by Ubi Franklin.

Discography

Compilation albums

Singles
As lead artist

Promotional singles

FilmographyReboundThe Re-Union''
 American Driver

Awards and nominations

References

External links

1988 births
Living people
American emigrants to Nigeria
Texas Southern University alumni
21st-century Nigerian women singers
Nigerian women singer-songwriters
People from Delta State
English-language singers from Nigeria
People from Tyler, Texas
Nigerian female models
21st-century Nigerian actresses
Nigerian film actresses
Nigerian rhythm and blues singers
American female models
Actresses from Texas
Singer-songwriters from Texas
21st-century American women singers
21st-century American singers
American people of Igbo descent
Igbo musicians
Igbo actresses